Destelbergen is a municipality located in the Belgian province of East Flanders. The municipality comprises the towns of Destelbergen proper and Heusden and was created on 1 January 1977, by the fusion of these two municipalities. Its western border touches the municipality of Ghent and Melle and is formed by an ancient silted up branch of the river Scheldt.

In 2021, Destelbergen had a total population of 18,683.

Attractions are the many residential castles, a Gaulish farmhouse, and the Damvallei nature reserve.

References

External links

Official website 

 
Municipalities of East Flanders
Populated places in East Flanders